Maroš Žemba (born September 25, 1986) is a Slovak professional ice hockey defenceman who played with HK SKP Poprad in the Slovak Extraliga during the 2010–11 season.

External links

1986 births
HK Poprad players
Living people
Slovak ice hockey defencemen
Sportspeople from Poprad